Havelock North is a town in the Hawke's Bay region of the North Island of New Zealand, situated less than 2 km south-east of the city of Hastings. It was a borough for many years until the 1989 reorganisation of local government saw it merged into the new Hastings District, and it is now administered by the Hastings District Council.

Overview 

The suburb, known locally as "the village", is situated on the Heretaunga Plains, less than 2 km to the south-east of Hastings. It is surrounded by numerous orchards and vineyards, and its industry is based around its fruit and wine production, and a horticultural research centre. The fertile soils that lie between Havelock North and Hastings has prevented urban sprawl linking them together. Havelock North itself is primarily residential and rural-residential housing, with only a relatively small and compact industrial and commercial centre. As a result, a large majority of its 13,000 residents commute each morning to the nearby cities (Hastings or Napier) for work.

Havelock North is generally hilly, and small gullies have been formed by the creeks and streams flowing from higher ground, resulting in a small amount of inaccessible or steep land which is converted into forests, parks or reserves, giving the image of naturally having many bushes and trees. This is due to the town being situated at the base of the prominent landmark Te Mata Peak, a 399-metre outcrop, which according to local Māori legend is the body of the giant Te Mata o Rongokako, and the depression in the land visible behind his head according to the myth is where he tried to bite through the mountain range which filled his stomach turning him to stone.

Both Hastings and Havelock North obtain water from secure confined aquifer systems. The Te Mata aquifer that feeds Havelock North is very similar to Hastings in quality, but has slightly elevated calcium levels. Hastings is situated directly over the Heretaunga Plains aquifer system.

History 

Havelock North was founded as a planned Government settlement following the purchase in 1858, from Māori owners, of land previously known as 'Karanema's Reserve'. The original village was laid out in 1860, taking its name from Sir Henry Havelock, who was involved in the suppression of the Indian Uprising, thus keeping with the local habit of naming towns after prominent men from Imperial India. Its founders originally envisaged a larger town for the site, but when the Wellington–Napier rail line went through the area in 1874 it took a direct route some distance from Havelock North, and Hastings became a more logical choice for residents.

In the early 1800s, the local Karamu Stream was part of the much larger Ngaruroro River system. It was termed the "River Plassey", the same name also being applied to a street in the village after the battle of Plassey of 1757 near Calcutta. Early survey plans of Havelock North show ferry landings where boats would sail up and down the river to collect and deliver supplies. This practice was phased out in the 1880s, when a number of large floods diverted the Ngaruroro River to its current course further north away from Havelock North. Later, during the 1931 earthquake, a bridge over the Karamu was completely destroyed.

Like a number of North Island towns, Havelock North has grown larger than its South Island namesake, Havelock, in the Marlborough Sounds.

Havelock North was the centre for Havelock Work, a quasi-religious movement based at a temple of the Stella Matutina magical order. This temple 
survives today as Whare Ra, which followed the early twentieth century teachings of the Hermetic Order of the Golden Dawn.

From 12 to 29 August 2016 the town experienced New Zealand's largest recorded outbreak of waterborne disease. Campylobacter entered the town's water supply after run off from a nearby sheep farm entered the Brookvale boreholes following heavy rain. Of the town's 13,000 residents, 5,500 fell ill, 45 were hospitalised and four died.

Demographics 

Havelock North had a population of 14,331 at the 2018 New Zealand census, an increase of 1,164 people (8.8%) since the 2013 census, and an increase of 2,109 people (17.3%) since the 2006 census. There were 5,505 households, comprising 6,564 males and 7,770 females, giving a sex ratio of 0.84 males per female, with 2,763 people (19.3%) aged under 15 years, 1,791 (12.5%) aged 15 to 29, 5,943 (41.5%) aged 30 to 64, and 3,840 (26.8%) aged 65 or older.

Ethnicities were 91.0% European/Pākehā, 10.0% Māori, 1.3% Pacific peoples, 3.5% Asian, and 2.1% other ethnicities. People may identify with more than one ethnicity.

The percentage of people born overseas was 20.8, compared with 27.1% nationally.

Although some people chose not to answer the census's question about religious affiliation, 46.5% had no religion, 43.5% were Christian, 0.6% had Māori religious beliefs, 0.5% were Hindu, 0.5% were Muslim, 0.5% were Buddhist and 1.7% had other religions.

Of those at least 15 years old, 3,228 (27.9%) people had a bachelor's or higher degree, and 1,626 (14.1%) people had no formal qualifications. 2,523 people (21.8%) earned over $70,000 compared to 17.2% nationally. The employment status of those at least 15 was that 5,097 (44.1%) people were employed full-time, 1,812 (15.7%) were part-time, and 225 (1.9%) were unemployed.

Education 

Havelock North has eight schools:
 Havelock North Primary School is a state contributing primary (Year 1–6) school with approximately  students.
 Lucknow School is a state contributing primary (Year 1–6) school with approximately  students.
 Te Mata School is a state contributing primary (Year 1–6) school with approximately  students.
 Hereworth School is a private boys' full primary (Year 1–8) school with approximately  students.
 Havelock North Intermediate is a state intermediate (Year 7–8) school with approximately  students.
 Havelock North High School is a state secondary (Year 9–13) school with approximately  students. The school opened in 1975.
 Iona College is a state-integrated Presbyterian girls' secondary school (Year 7–13) with approximately  students. The school opened in 1914.
 Woodford House is a state-integrated Anglican girls' secondary (Year 7–13) school with approximately  students. It was established by Annie Mabel Hodge in 1894. When she retired in 1922, she was succeeded by Dorice Mary Holland.

Hereworth, Iona College and Woodford House are boarding schools. They take a very few local day pupils.

Residents 
Notable residents have included:

Mac Cooper (1910–1989), agriculturalist and author
 Alan Duff (born 1950), novelist 
 Dr Robert William Felkin (1853–1926), medical missionary, ceremonial magician, author on Uganda and Central Africa, explorer, and early anthropologist
 Neil Gaiman (born 1960), author
Virginia Heath (born 1959), film director and academic
Amy Hodgson(1888—1983), botanist
 Alfred Meebold (1863–1952), botanist, writer, and anthroposopher (died at Havelock North)
 Amanda Palmer (born 1976), musician
 Jarrod Smith (born 1984), footballer
 Herbert Sutcliffe (1878–1971), health advocate
 Ihaia West (born 1992), rugby union player

References

External links

 Official Online Destination & Tourism Marketing Centre
 Visitor Information
 About Havelock North

Populated places in the Hawke's Bay Region
Hastings District